Stanley is a 1996 play written by English playwright, Pam Gems. The play was premiered at the Royal National Theatre's Cottesloe Theatre in London.

Plot synopsis
The play explores the complicated life of British painter Stanley Spencer, who was played by Antony Sher in the play's London and Broadway debuts.

Spencer was a twentieth century painter, whose work attempted to combine the sexual with the divine in contemporary English settings. His paintings frequently showed biblical scenes taking place in ordinary English villages, particularly Cookham, and often depicted, or used figures inspired by, his friends, relatives and lovers.

Spencer married two different women; he left his first wife, Hilda Carline, an artist who put her ambition aside to make a home for him, to marry Patricia Preece, a defiantly unconventional lesbian who made her reputation as an artist by passing off the works of her lover, Dorothy Hepworth, as her own, and who was incapable of loving him. Much of the play revolves around his passionate attachment to both women.

Awards and nominations 
 Awards
 1996 Evening Standard Award for Best Play
 1997 Laurence Olivier Award for Best New Play
 1997 Laurence Olivier Award for Best Actor- Antony Sher
 1997 Laurence Olivier Award for Best Actress in a Supporting Role- Deborah Findlay
 1997 Laurence Olivier Award for Best Set Designer- Tim Hatley
 Nominations
 1997 Tony Award for Best Play
 1997 Tony Award for Best Actor in a Play- Antony Sher
 1997 Tony Award for Best Direction of a Play- John Caird
 1997 Laurence Olivier Award for Best Actress in a Supporting Role- Anna Chancellor

References

External links
 
 

1996 plays
English plays
Broadway plays
Off-Broadway plays
Laurence Olivier Award-winning plays
West End plays